The 1988–89 Illinois Fighting Illini men's basketball team represented the University of Illinois.

Regular season
The 1988-89 team may have been the most talented team ever assembled at the University of Illinois. The team was so athletic that they could "run and alley-oop" baskets using even the non-starting players, and a record number of 100+ game scores reflected this fact.  The players known as the
“Flying Illini,” included all the important pieces from the 1987-88 squad (Kenny Battle, Kendall Gill, Steve Bardo, Lowell Hamilton, Nick Anderson and Larry Smith) as well as junior college All-American P.J. Bowman and former high school All-American Marcus Liberty. The Fighting Illini won their first 16 games and were ranked No. 2 in the nation going into a nationally televised game against Georgia Tech, whom Illinois had already beaten, 80-75, at the Rainbow Classic in December. The Yellow Jackets led, 47-31, but Illinois managed to surge back to force overtime, eventually needing two extra periods to win the game. Along with the No. 1 ranking the next day came some bad news. Illinois’ catalyst, Gill, had broken a bone in his foot and would miss the next 12 games. Hurt by the loss of Gill, Illinois lost three of the next four games and its No. 1 ranking. The Illini rallied to finish second in the Big Ten with a 14-4 record and with Gill back in the lineup, the Illini were awarded a No. 1 seed in the Midwest Region of the NCAA tournament. After rolling to victories over McNeese State and Ball State at the Hoosier Dome, a powerpacked regional in Minneapolis with Missouri, Louisville and Syracuse, stood in the way of Illinois’ trip to the Final Four.
Louisville fell victim to Illinois, losing 83-69, which set up a regional final matchup with Syracuse. The Fighting Illini held off Syracuse to advance to the Final Four in Seattle where Illinois faced Michigan, a team it
had beaten twice already in conference play, in the national semifinals. Michigan was inspired by the firing of their coach prior to the tournament, and won a game that contained 33 lead changes.  Despite Battle’s 29-point, 11-rebound effort, Illinois fell to eventual national-champion Michigan, 83-81.

Roster

Source

Schedule
												
Source																
												

|-
!colspan=12 style="background:#DF4E38; color:white;"| Non-Conference regular season

|-
!colspan=9 style="background:#DF4E38; color:#FFFFFF;"|Big Ten regular season	

|-
!colspan=9 style="text-align: center; background:#DF4E38"|NCAA tournament

|-

Player stats

Head Coach Lou Henson (14th year at Illinois)

Awards and honors
Stephen Bardo
Big Ten Defensive Player of the Year
Nick Anderson
Team Most Valuable Player 
NCAA Tournament Regional Most Outstanding Player
Fighting Illini All-Century team (2005)
Kenny Battle
Fighting Illini All-Century team (2005)
 Kendall Gill
Fighting Illini All-Century team (2005)

Team players drafted into the NBA

Rankings

References

Illinois Fighting Illini
Illinois Fighting Illini men's basketball seasons
NCAA Division I men's basketball tournament Final Four seasons
Illinois
1988 in sports in Illinois
1989 in sports in Illinois